Kendrickia may refer to:
 Kendrickia (gastropod), a genus of gastropods in the family Camaenidae
 Kendrickia (plant), a genus of plants in the family Melastomataceae